NASA 515 is a heavily modified Boeing 737 for NASA use as a continuing research facility. The aircraft was the first 737 built and was used by Boeing to qualify the 737 design. NASA 515 was maintained and flown by Langley Research Center as part of the Terminal Area Productivity (TAP) program.

After its use by NASA was concluded in 2003, the aircraft was preserved, and is on public display at the Museum of Flight, near Seattle, Washington. It is the last Boeing 737-100 still in existence.

See also
 List of NASA aircraft

References

External links

  months Boeing-737-130

NASA aircraft
Boeing aircraft
Individual aircraft